Many (but not all) graphemes that are part of a writing system that encodes a full spoken language are included in the Unicode standard, which also includes graphical symbols.  See:

 Language code
 List of Unicode characters
 List of writing systems
 Punctuation
 :Category:Typographical symbols

The remainder of this list focuses on graphemes not part of spoken language-encoding systems.

Basic communication
 — No symbol
 Arrow (symbol)
 Character
 Emoji
 ☺ — Smiley
 ✓ — checkmark (UK: tick)
 Harvey balls
 ☆ — Star (polygon)
 I - signal, example: [?10, 1, 10 000, 2, 202, 2000]
 0 - lack of signal, example: [ ],[0]

Scientific and engineering symbols
 Alchemical symbols
 Astronomical symbols
 Planet symbols
 Chemical symbols
 Electronic symbol (for circuit diagrams, etc.)
 Engineering drawing symbols
 Energy Systems Language
 Hazard symbols
 List of mathematical constants (typically letters and compound symbols)
 Glossary of mathematical symbols
 List of physical constants (typically letters and compound symbols)
 List of common physics notations (typically letters used as variable names in equations)
 Rod of Asclepius / Caduceus as a symbol of medicine

Consumer symbols

 Various currency signs (sublist)

Navigational symbols

 Traffic signs, including warning signs contain many specialized symbols (see article for list)
 DOT pictograms
 ISO 7001
 Exit sign,  "running man"
 Gender symbols for public toilets
 Japanese map symbols
 International Breastfeeding Symbol
 International Symbol of Access
 Barber's pole

Food

 EC identification and health marks, for animal products
 Food safe symbol marking food contact materials in the European Union
 British Egg Industry Council lion

Kosher symbols
 Star-K Kosher Certification
 OK Kosher Certification
 EarthKosher Kosher Certification

General consumer products

 Recycling symbol
 Recycling codes
 Japanese recycling symbols
 Green Dot (symbol)
 Laundry symbol
 Period-after-opening symbol (on cosmetics as 6M, 12M, 18M, etc.)
  - keep dry
  - keep dry
 Japanese postal mark
 ℮, the European estimated sign U+212E
 Inventory tracking symbols
 Barcode such as a Universal Product Code
 QR code
 Printing registration marks intended for the manufacturer of the packaging, to ensure different colors are aligned when printed
 Various certification marks (see article for list) signifying conformance with a government or private organization's requirements
 Shipping symbols from ISO standard 780 "Pictorial marking for handling of goods" or ASTM D5445 "Standard Practice for Pictorial Markings for Handling of Goods" which depict shipping boxes as squares with rounded corners:
 "Fragile": the silhouette of a broken wine glass
 "This end up": a horizontal line with two arrows pointing up
 "Do not stack": a filled-in box, under a crossed-out outlined box
 "Maximum stack height": three boxes stacked vertically; the bottom one is filled in, the middle one is an outline with a number inside (the number of boxes to safely stack on top of this one), and the top one is an outline and crossed out
 "Maximum stack weight": from the bottom upward: a box, a horizontal line, a wide arrow pointing down, and a number followed by "kg max"
 "Keep dry": an umbrella with rain falling on it
 "Protect from sunlight": a circle with rays coming out of it, with a box protected by a chevron
 "Protect from radiation": the radiation symbol, separated from a box by a chevron
 "Center of gravity": crosshairs pointing to the center of a dashed circle
 "Do not roll": a box with a curved arrow above, and a cross-out line coming up from the box at an angle
 "Do not use hand hooks"
 "Do not use hand truck"
 "Do not use forklift"
 "Clamp as indicated": a filled-in box with a vertical line and inward-pointing arrow on the right and left
 "Do not clamp": the same as "clamp as indicated", crossed out
 "Sling here": the silhouette of a chain
 A thermometer with a diagonal slash, indicating the maximum and minimum temperature

Property and pricing
 
 
 
 
 U+24CDⓍ, U+24E8 Ⓨ - Japanese typographic symbols used under Japan's resale price maintenance system
 Various logos
 Various trademarks

Technology symbols
 Media control symbols
 Power symbol
 Various computer icons

Naval
Jolly Roger - "this ship is controlled by pirates"
International Code of Signals
International maritime signal flags

Religious and mystical symbols

A subset has been used as United States Department of Veterans Affairs emblems for headstones and markers.

A
Adinkra symbols
Alchemical symbols
الله Allah
Angel Moroni
Ankh
Armenian eternity sign
Astrological sign
Astrological symbols
Astrology and alchemy
ॐ Aum/Om syllable (sound symbol)
Agriculture

B
Ba guahi 
Bahá'í symbols
Bhavacakra
Bindi
Bindu
Borjgali

C
☤ Caduceus, a symbol of commerce, often erroneously used as a symbol of medicine.
 Camunian rose
 Celtic cross
חַי Chai
ΧΡ Chi Rho
 Christian symbolism
 Christian cross / Christian cross variants
 Conch shell
 Coptic cross
☽ Crescent
 Cross
 Cross and Crown
 Cross and flame
 Cross of Sacrifice
 Cross of St. Peter
 Crucifix
 Crux Gemmata

D
Dharmacakra
Divided line of
 Plato
Dragon
Dragon's Eye

E
Eight auspicious symbols of Tibetan Buddhism
ੴ Ek Onkar
Endless knot
Enneagram
⊙ Eye of God
Eye of Horus
Eye of Providence

F
Flaming chalice
Fleur-de-lis

G
Gankyil
Globus cruciger
Golden spiral
Goetic seals
Geometry symbols

H
Hamsa
Hands of God
Happy Human
Heart
High cross
Holy Grail
Holy Bible

I
Ichthys
Infinity
Inuksuk
Information
Illuminati

K
Kagome crest
Khamsa/Hamesh Hand/Hand of Fatima
Khachkar
Khanda

L
Labarum
Cantabrian labarum
Labrys
Lauburu
Life
Lingam
Lotus
Looped square

M
Maltese Cross
Mandala
Medicine wheel
Menorah
Merkaba
Math
Mjölnir

N
Ner tamid
Nataraj

O
O1G
Occult symbols
Ouroboros

P
Papal cross
Patriarchal cross
Pearl
Pentacle
Pentagram

Q
Quincunx

R
Raven banner
Red Cross
Red Rose of Lancaster
Rod of Asclepius

S
Sacred Chao
Sacred Heart
Saint symbolism
Scientology symbols
Shield of the Trinity
Sigil
Sigillum Dei
Sigil of Baphomet
Sigils of demons
Skull and crossbones, Jolly Roger
Solar symbols
Radiate crown
Sunburst
Sun of May
Vergina Sun
Winged sun
Soyombo symbol
Star
Star and crescent
Star of David
Starburst
Star polygon
Five-pointed star
Arabic star
Sun cross
Swastika
Square and Compasses

T
Taiji
Taegeuk
Taijitu
Tanit symbol
Tarot iconography
Tattva symbols
Tetractys
Thor's Hammer
Tilaka
Tomoe
Torii
Three hares
Tree of Life
Tree of Peace
Trefoil
Trimurti
Triple Goddess
Triple spiral
Triquetra
Triratna/Three Jewels
Triskelion
Tudor Rose
Tursaansydän
Turtle

U
Urantia symbols

V
Vajra
Valknut
Vande matram
Vesica piscis

W
White buffalo
White Rose of York
White stag
Wreath

Y
Yantra
Yin-yang
Yoni

Heraldic symbols

Charge (heraldry)
List of heraldic charges
Coat of arms
 List of coats of arms
Mon (emblem)
Mullet
Monogram
Flag
Vexillology / Glossary of vexillology
Maritime flag
Insignia

Historical
Gediminid
House mark
Rurikid
Tamga

Sports and games
 Chess symbols in Unicode
 Olympic symbols
 Paralympic symbols

Political symbols

 Anarchist symbolism
 Communist symbolism
 Fascist symbolism
 Flash and circle
 Francoist Symbol
 Meander
 Nazi symbolism
 Black Sun
 National symbol / Lists of national symbols
 Cockade
 Religion in national symbols
 Roundel
 Military aircraft insignia
 Sun of the Alps
 Z, a Russian military symbol

Other
 Color / Color symbolism
 St. Patrick's blue
 Cigar store Indian
 Currency symbol
 Musical symbols
 LGBT symbols
 Lucky symbols
 Plant
 Maple leaf
 Rose
 Shamrock

See also

 Cultural icon
 International common standards
 Logo
 Notation
 Ornament
 Pictogram
 Sign
 Typography

References

Symbols